Anselmo Gonzaga was a Filipino sprinter. He competed in the 100 m and 200 m events at the 1928 Summer Olympics, but failed to reach the finals. Gonzaga won one gold and two silver medals in these events at the Far Eastern Championship Games, which were a precursor to the Asian Games.

References

External links
 

1906 births
Year of death missing
Filipino male sprinters
Athletes (track and field) at the 1928 Summer Olympics
Olympic track and field athletes of the Philippines
Silliman University alumni

https://pinoyathletics.info/anselmo-gonzaga/